Nightmare in Wax is a 1969 horror film. Cameron Mitchell plays Vince Rinaud, a former film special effects artist who is disfigured by Max Block, the head of Paragon Pictures, and also a rival for the affections of a woman (Anne Helm). Leaving the film industry, Vince becomes a recluse and opens a wax museum. Within a few months, four popular Paragon stars disappear. Wax figures of the missing stars soon feature as wax models in the museum and the police become suspicious.

Plot
Vince Rinaud has liquor thrown in his face while lighting a cigarette during a party.  Despite diving into the pool half his face is disfigured.  As a result he becomes recluse and opens a wax museum.  As various Paragon stars disappear new figures appear in his museum.  It turns out that he has taken the theory of a Doctor Zerkai of using truth serum and a compound called Nerving will put a person into suspend animation for centuries and put it into practice to fill his museum.  The formula has one flaw though - its influence is dampened by electricity (including electrical storms).  He finally gets Max Block as the police close in and is about to make him into a figure.  Max Block laughs and enrage Vince lunges forward and falls into the pool of molten wax.  He is surrounded by everyone who is laughing at him and then a phone wakes him up.  Answering it he is reminded of the party and not to be late.

Cast
Cameron Mitchell as Vincent Renard 
Anne Helm as Marie Morgan 
Scott Brady as Detective Haskell 
Berry Kroeger as Max Black 
Johnny Cardos as Sergeant Carver
Victoria Carroll as Theresa
Kent Osborne as Bartender

External links
 

1969 films
1969 horror films
American independent films
American horror films
Films directed by Bud Townsend
Crown International Pictures films
1969 directorial debut films
1960s English-language films
1960s American films